Roman Baskin (25 December 1954 – 13 September 2018) was an Estonian actor and director of stage and screen.

His parents were Eino Baskin and Ita Ever. Baskin's credits as an actor included Lotte from Gadgetville (2006), 186 Kilometres (2007), Letters to Angel (2010), and The Idiot (2011). He directed Peace Street in 1991, and a television film adaptation of The Visit in 2006.

For his career in film, Baskin received the Order of the White Star, fourth class in 2018. He was diagnosed with cancer and died on 13 September 2018.

References

1954 births
2018 deaths
21st-century Estonian male actors
Estonian male film actors
Estonian male stage actors
Estonian male voice actors
Estonian film directors
Deaths from cancer in Estonia
Recipients of the Order of the White Star, 4th Class
Estonian Academy of Music and Theatre alumni
Estonian people of Jewish descent
Estonian people of Russian descent